Alexander Sergeyevich Georgiev (born 17 July 1975) is a Russian draughts player. He won the world championship in international draughts in 2002, 2003, 2004, 2006, 2011, 2013 (two time), 2015 (two time), 2019. In 2018 he was second at the world championship in Frisian draughts. Russian national champion (13 times).

Participation in World and European Championships

* Tied for 1st-3rd places, won blitz tournament.

** In final.

*** The main part of the match ended in a draw. The winner was determined in additional matches.

**** Equality in the classical format, the advantage in the Rapid format.

References

External links
 Alexander Georgiev
 Profile at the Dutch draughts Federation archive KNDB
 Profile at the site FMJD
Shashki Russian draughts page

1975 births
Living people
People from Novgorod Oblast
Russian draughts players
Players of international draughts
Sportspeople from Novgorod Oblast